Chung Uk Tsuen aka. Kwong Tin Wai is a walled village in Lam Tei, Tuen Mun District, Hong Kong.

Administration
Chung Uk Tsuen is a recognized village under the New Territories Small House Policy. It is one of the 36 villages represented within the Tuen Mun Rural Committee. For electoral purposes, Chung Uk Tsuen is part of the Tuen Mun Rural constituency, which is currently represented by Kenneth Cheung Kam-hung.

History
The Chungs of Chung Uk Tsuen moved from Dongguan during the Ming dynasty.

Tsing Chuen Wai appears on the "Map of the San-On District", published in 1866 by Simeone Volonteri.

Education
Chung Uk Tsuen is in Primary One Admission (POA) School Net 70. Within the school net are multiple aided schools (operated independently but funded with government money) and the following government schools: Tuen Mun Government Primary School (屯門官立小學).

See also
 Walled villages of Hong Kong
 Chung Uk Tsuen stop

References

External links

 Delineation of area of existing village Chung Uk Tsuen (Tuen Mun) for election of resident representative (2019 to 2022)
 Pictures of Nai Wai and other villages of Lam Tei
 Pictures of Chung Ancestral Hall, Chung Uk Tsuen
 Pictures of Chung Uk Tsuen

Walled villages of Hong Kong
Lam Tei
Villages in Tuen Mun District, Hong Kong